SOLAR (acronym for Sound of Los Angeles Records)  was an American record label founded in 1977 by Dick Griffey, reconstituted out of Soul Train Records only two years after it was founded with Soul Train television show host and creator Don Cornelius.

History 
SOLAR began in 1975 as Soul Train Records, founded by Dick Griffey and Soul Train creator Don Cornelius. The first act they signed was an R&B vocal quartet they named The Soul Train Gang (Gerald Brown, Terry Brown, Judy Jones, Patricia Williamson, and later Denise Smith), who performed one of Soul Train's many themes, "Soul Train '75". Their first album was entitled Don Cornelius Presents The Soul Train Gang. In 1976, their second album, The Soul Train Gang, produced by Philly's Norman Harris, was released. The Gang broke up in 1977.

That same year, Singer/drummer Arnie Oliver, aka Ahaguna G. Sun, and singer/guitarist Werner "Bear" Schuchner comprised Sunbear, a little-known soul/funk vocal duo that recorded in Los Angeles in 1977. Earth, Wind & Fire was a heavy influence on Sunbear, and there were also hints of Tower of Power and El Chicano in their sound. In 1977, Sunbear recorded its self-titled debut album for Don Cornelius and Dick Griffey's Soul Train Records, which evolved into Solar Records after Cornelius' departure in 1978. Sunbear broke up without ever recording a second album, and Oliver and Schuchner both went on to pursue other activities in the R&B world. Oliver became a member of Frankie Beverly's Maze, while Schuchner played guitar on albums by the Whispers, the Soul Train Gang, High Inergy, and others. In 1980, the Whispers recorded Sunbear's ballad "Fantasy" for their hit album Imagination.

Griffey formed a collective called Shalamar, using a host of session singers to record "Uptown Festival," a disco-length medley of early Motown hits. After scoring a hit with the recording, he looked to Cornelius to help him put together an actual group to maintain the impact.  In 1977, Soul Train dancers Jody Watley and Jeffrey Daniels and former Soul Train Gang member Gerald Brown (who was eventually replaced by Howard Hewett) were recruited to form the new Shalamar, which would become the fledgling label's centerpiece.  Cornelius wanted to shut down the label and Griffey paid him $300,000 for his interests in the label. Cornelius wanted to focus his energies on the TV show — which was a monster hit and required his full attention to keep it so. With legalities now taken care of, Griffey reorganized Soul Train Records into the newly founded SOLAR label in late 1977. Griffey and Cornelius remained good friends, and as a result SOLAR maintained close ties to the Soul Train show.

Success 
SOLAR was known for several others who enjoyed success, including: The Whispers, Dynasty, Lakeside, Midnight Star, Klymaxx, Calloway, Carrie Lucas, Collage and The Deele — which introduced singer/songwriter/producer Kenneth "Babyface" Edmonds and future music executive Antonio "L.A." Reid. Griffey had always believed in giving new talents the opportunity to create and develop their craft, and he was introduced to songwriters/producers Jimmy Jam and Terry Lewis by his A & R rep Dina R. Andrews (Dina Andrews Management Inc) who was the team's first manager, Reggie and Vincent Calloway, and Leon F. Sylvers III. The "SOLAR sound" was a collective effort, with artists working on each other's sessions and artists encouraged to be creative. Sylvers became SOLAR's house producer in 1978 and his signature basslines and productions helped mould the hit sound of SOLAR, which is funky, progressive dance music infused with soul and disco.

Decline 
By 1987, the label began to see its commercial fortunes decline. Contributing to the decline were A&R problems with Shalamar, primarily, maintaining the group's identity and momentum as former members Hewett and Watley had departed and were having successful solo careers on other labels. The shifting musical directions of R&B, dance and popular music in general in the late 1980s and early 1990s also contributed to their decline.

Distribution
From 1977 to 1981, SOLAR was distributed by RCA Records, which had also distributed the Soul Train Records label during its two-year run. Griffey formed a second label, Constellation Records (no relation to the Chicago-based indie label founded by Ewart Abner) in 1981, which focused on more contemporary and top forty-geared acts to Griffey's more traditionally "urban" establishment (including Jon Gibson and Klymaxx).  Upon its formation, Constellation was distributed through Elektra/Asylum Records, making it only natural for the main SOLAR label to jump ship to Elektra for distribution when it left RCA.

In the meantime, the Constellation label moved to MCA Records for distribution in 1984. Shortly thereafter, Griffey decided to abandon contemporary music to focus all of his attention on running SOLAR, and retaining its sonic theme. Subsequently, MCA bought the Constellation imprint and absorbed its artists, including Klymaxx, which had been its biggest act.

SOLAR's relationship with Elektra lasted until 1986. After the Elektra distribution deal expired, SOLAR briefly took up distribution with Capitol Records until 1989, at which time it signed a new distribution deal with Epic Records, which oversaw what would ultimately become its twilight years. In the early 1990s, the label released its last recordings- 1991's Now by Richie Havens and the soundtrack to the 1992 film Deep Cover.

Part of the label's back catalog, which includes the pre-1984 Constellation back catalog, were eventually purchased by EMI, with many of its releases and compilations being re-issued through The Right Stuff Records. In 2009, Unidisc Music purchased part of SOLAR's back catalog for Canada, USA and South African territories. BMG owns the rights to part of the SOLAR catalog in the UK and Europe although the rights to SOLAR RECORDS as a trade mark and brand belong to the family of the late Dick Griffey according to the Intellectual Property Office.

UK relaunch 
In 2018, 40 years after the founding of SOLAR Records, the label was relaunched in the UK by the family of the late Dick Griffey, according to issue 77 of UK Publication 'Soul Survivors Magazine' which featured an interview with both Carrie Lucas and new CEO Jessie Tsang. At the helm of the relaunched label is Griffey's widow Carrie Lucas, his daughter Carolyn Griffey and British Chinese music promoter and IP paralegal consultant Jessie Tsang. Solar Records incorporates the Soul Train Records and Soul Train Club brands. Jessie Tsang serves as CEO with Sonia Damney as Vice President. In 2022 Carrie Lucas, Carolyn Griffey, Dina Andrews, Virgil Roberts participated with US Cable channel TV One for a special episode of the UNSUNG TV series on Dick Griffey and Solar Records. The episode premiered on November 6th, 2022.

Artists 
 Absolute
 Babyface
 Calloway
 Collage
 The Deele
 Dynasty
 Klymaxx
 Lakeside
 Carrie Lucas
 Midnight Star
 Shalamar
 The Soul Train Gang
 The Sylvers
 The Whispers
 3rd Avenue
 Times 3
 1-900

In-house producers 
Leon Sylvers III (1978-1983)
Reggie Calloway  (1983-1986)
L.A. Reid & Babyface (1986-1989)

See also 
List of record labels

References

External links 
Official Website

 
Record labels established in 1977
Defunct record labels of the United States
Rhythm and blues record labels
Soul music record labels
Soul Train
IFPI members
Post-disco record labels